The Mays were a series of paintings in 17th and early 18th century Paris. They were commissioned by the goldsmiths' guild of Paris to offer to the cathedral of Notre-Dame de Paris in the early days of the month of May. The tradition began in 1630 and one painting was offered each year between then and 1707, with the exception of 1683 and 1694.

List of the Mays

1630 establishments
1707 disestablishments
Lists of paintings
Notre-Dame de Paris